Autoimmune thyroiditis, also known as Hashimoto's disease and chronic lymphocytic thyroiditis, is a chronic disease occurring in the thyroid, the butterfly-shaped endocrine gland in the anterior neck. This disease occurs when the body interprets components of the thyroid glands as threats, therefore producing special antibodies that target the thyroid's cells or proteins, thereby destroying it. It most commonly presents as hypothyroidism with or without a goiter. It is the most common cause of hypothyroidism in iodine-sufficient areas of the world.

Signs and symptoms 

Signs and symptoms are variable, may affect any bodily system, and are based on the clinical course. Early stages of autoimmune thyroiditis may have a normal physical exam with or without a goiter. A goiter is a diffuse, often symmetric, swelling of the thyroid gland visible in the anterior neck that may develop. 

Some patients in the early stage of the disease may experience symptoms of hyperthyroidism due to the release of thyroid hormones from intermittent thyroid destruction.

As lymphocytic infiltration progresses, patients may exhibit signs of hypothyroidism in multiple bodily systems, including, but not limited to, a larger goiter, weight gain, cold intolerance, fatigue, myxedema, constipation, menstrual disturbances, pale or dry skin, and dry, brittle hair, depression, ataxia, and muscle weakness.

Patients with goiters who have had autoimmune thyroiditis for many years might see their goiter shrink in the later stages of the disease due to destruction of the thyroid.

While rare, more serious complications of the hypothyroidism resulting from autoimmune thyroiditis are pericardial effusion, pleural effusion, both of which require further medical attention, and myxedema coma, which is an endocrine emergency.

Epidemiology
Autoimmune thyroiditis is the most common cause of hypothyroidism in settings of sufficient iodine. It is estimated to affect 2% of the world's population. It may affect up to 5% of the United States' population. Anyone may develop this disease, but autoimmune thyroiditis affects women more often than men by about 10 times. The difference in prevalence amongst genders is due to the effects of sex hormones. Incidence peaks in the fifth decade of life, but patients are usually diagnosed between age 30-50.

Genetics 
Thyroid autoimmunity can be familial.  Many patients report a family history of autoimmune thyroiditis or Graves disease. Twin studies have revealed a concordance of Hashimoto's disease in monozygotic twins.

High iodine consumption 
Autoimmune thyroiditis has a higher prevalence in societies that have a higher intake of iodine in their diet, such as the United States and Japan. It is the most common cause of hypothyroidism in areas of sufficient iodine. Also, the rate of lymphocytic infiltration increased in areas where the iodine intake was once low, but increased due to iodine supplementation.

Age 
It has been shown that "the prevalence of positive tests for thyroid antibodies increases with age, with a frequency as high as 33 percent in women 70 years old or older." Incidence peaks in the fifth decade of life and the prevalence increases with age.

Relationship to other autoimmune conditions 
Graves disease may occur before or after the development of autoimmune thyroiditis. Patients may also have coexisting autoimmune conditions of other organs. These may include Addison disease, type 1 diabetes, Sjogren's syndrome, Celiac disease, and rheumatoid arthritis. Autoimmune thyroiditis has also been seen in patients with autoimmune polyendocrine syndromes type 1 and 2.

Mechanism
The mechanism of autoimmune thyroiditis is not well understood, but is thought to develop as a result of a complex interaction of genetics and environmental factors. Thyroid autoantibodies appear mostly with the presence of lymphocytes in the targeted organ. Lymphocytes produce antibodies targeting three different thyroid proteins: Thyroid peroxidase Antibodies (TPOAb), Thyroglobulin Antibodies (TgAb), and Thyroid stimulating hormone receptor Antibodies (TRAb).
The antibody attacks ultimately lead to hypothyroidism, which is caused by replacement of follicular cells with parenchymatous tissue.

The two antibodies most commonly implicated in autoimmune thyroiditis are antibodies against thyroid peroxidase (TPOAb) and thyroglobulin (TgAb). They are hypothesized to develop as a result of thyroid damage, where T-lymphocytes are sensitized to residual thyroid peroxidase and thyroglobulin, rather than as the cause of thyroid damage. However, they may exacerbate further thyroid destruction by binding the complement system and triggering apoptosis of thyroid cells. Environmental factors that may predispose patients to this type of immune dysregulation include toxins, medications, dietary factors, and infectious agents.

Some patients who are healthy or asymptomatic may be positive for more than one of these antibodies.  Doctors who attend to such patients will most likely monitor these patients as there is a chance that they will develop some type of dysfunction with time.

Pathology 

Gross pathology of a thyroid with autoimmune thyroiditis may show an symmetrically enlarged thyroid. It is often paler in color, in comparison to normal thyroid tissue which is reddish-brown. Microscopic examination will show infiltration of lymphocytes and plasma cells. The lymphocytes are predominately T-lymphocytes with a representation of both CD4 positive and CD8 positive cells. The plasma cells are polyclonal, with present germinal centers resembling the structure of a lymph node. Fibrous tissue may be found throughout the affected thyroid as well. Generally, pathological findings of the thyroid are related to the amount of existing thyroid function - the more infiltration and fibrosis, the less likely a patient will have normal thyroid function. In late stages of the disease, the thyroid may be atrophic.

Diagnosis 
Various tests can be chosen depending on the presenting symptoms. For patients with autoimmune thyroiditis, while it is known that many patients may have circulating antibodies before they present with any symptoms, patients may present to their doctors for evaluation with symptoms of hypothyroidism. Physicians will often start by assessing reported symptoms and performing a thorough physical exam, including a neck exam.

Laboratory values 
The initial diagnostic evaluation will start with plasma thyroid-stimulating hormone (TSH) concentration. If elevated, it signifies hypothyroidism. The elevation is usually a marked increase over the normal range and is generally greater than 20 mg/dl. Free T4 levels will usually be lowered, but sometimes might be normal.

Doctors may check thyroglobulin antibodies (TgAb) whenever a thyroglobulin test is performed to see if the antibody is interfering. TgAb may also be ordered in regular intervals after a person has been diagnosed with thyroid cancer, and just like TPOAb, it can be associated with Hashimoto's thyroiditis. The most common complement of lab values in patients with autoimmune thyroiditis are high TSH, low T4, and positive TPO antibodies.

Ultrasound 

When patients have normal laboratory values but symptoms of autoimmune thyroiditis, ultrasound plays a role in diagnosis. Images obtained with ultrasound can evaluate the size of the thyroid and further support the diagnosis of autoimmune thyroiditis, reveal the presence of nodules, or provide clues to the diagnosis of other thyroid conditions.

Treatment

The standard of care is levothyroxine therapy, which is an oral medication structured like endogenous T4. Levothyroxine can be dosed based upon weight, most commonly, or TSH elevation. Usually the dose prescribed ranges from 1.6 mcg/kg to 1.8 mcg/kg, but can be adjusted based upon each patient. For example, the dose may be lowered for elderly patients or patients with certain cardiac conditions, but should be increased in pregnant patients. It should be administered on a consistent schedule. Some patients elect combination therapy with both levothyroxine and liothyronine, which is a synthetic T3, however studies of combination therapy are limited.

Side effects of thyroid replacement therapy are associated with iatrogenic hyperthyroidism. Symptoms to watch out for include, but are not limited to, anxiety, tremor, weight loss, heat sensitivity, diarrhea, and shortness of breath. More worrisome symptoms include atrial fibrillation and bone density loss.

Monitoring 
TSH is the laboratory value of choice for monitoring response to treatment with levothyroixine. When treatment is first initiated, TSH levels may be monitored as often as a frequency of every 6–8 weeks. Each time the dose is adjusted, TSH levels may be measured at that frequency until the correct dose is determined. Once titrated to a proper dose, TSH levels will be monitored yearly.

Surgery Considerations 
Surgery is not the initial treatment of choice for autoimmune, and it is not an indication for thyroidectomy. Patients generally may begin discussing surgery with their doctor if they are experiencing significant pressure symptoms, cosmetic concerns, or have nodules present on ultrasound.

References

External links 

Thyroid disease